

Toru Mardan

Toru is a village and union council in Mardan District of Khyber Pakhtunkhwa. It has an altitude of 291 m (958 feet). 
The inhabitants of Toru are Yousafzai Pashtun, tracing their origin to central Asia and Afghanistan in particular.

Location
Toru is located South of Mardan City, surrounded by two perennial nullahs called Kalpani and Balar; the former descends down from the heights of Malakand to the plains of this vast, fertile tract, while the later comes from the adjacent district of Swabi.

References

Union councils of Mardan District
Populated places in Mardan District